St Joseph's Māori Girls' College or Hato Hōhepa is a Catholic, integrated, boarding and day college in Taradale, New Zealand, for girls in Year 7 to Year 13.  It is the largest Māori girls' boarding secondary school in New Zealand.

History
St Joseph's Māori Girls' College was founded in 1867 by the Sisters of Our Lady of the Missions. The college commenced on the property which is now Sacred Heart College, Napier when the Sisters and the Māori Missioner, Fr Reigner SM, started a little boarding school for Māori girls at first called St Joseph's Providence, which opened on 10 October 1867 with twenty pupils. The first principal was Sister Mary St John. The college usually had an enrollment of up to 60 pupils each year into the twentieth century. After the Napier earthquake of 1931 St Joseph's was rebuilt on its present site at Greenmeadows and reopened in 1935. The Sisters remained the school's proprietors. In 1982 the proprietors signed an integration Agreement with the Minister of Education and the college entered the State education system.

Compilations
 He Koha Waiata - A Gift Of Song (South Pacific Recordings) (1996)

Notable alumni
 Whina Cooper ONZ DBE
 Moana Maniapoto  : New Zealand singer, songwriter and documentarymaker
 Hinewehi Mohi: New Zealand singer/songwriter and television producer
 Katerina Mataira DNZM: Academic, artist, author, linguist and Maori-language programme developer
 Whirimako Black MNZM: New Zealand singer
 Georgina Kingi DNZM: Current principal of the college

Notes

References/Sources
 Maria van der Linden, St Joseph’s Maori Girls’ College, 1867-1990 : nga korero mo te Kura Maori o Hato Hohepa, Dunmore Press, Palmerston North, 1990.
 Michael King, God's farthest outpost : a history of Catholics in New Zealand, Viking, Auckland 1997.

Boarding schools in New Zealand
Educational institutions established in 1867
Schools in Napier, New Zealand
Catholic secondary schools in New Zealand
1867 establishments in New Zealand
Secondary schools in the Hawke's Bay Region
Māori schools in New Zealand